Stigmella auricularia is a moth of the family Nepticulidae. It is known from the southernmost part of Primorskiy Kray in the Khasan District (near the Korean border) in Russia.

External links
Nepticulidae and Opostegidae of the world

Nepticulidae
Moths of Asia
Moths described in 2003